The 1928 Richmond Spiders football team was an American football team that represented the University of Richmond as a member of the Virginia Conference during the 1928 college football season. Led by 15th-year head coach, Frank Dobson, Richmond compiled an overall record of 3–4–2. The team included Herbie Peterson, whom Dobson considered one of the three best backs he ever coached. Richmond played their home games at Tate Field on Mayo Island.

Schedule

References

Richmond
Richmond Spiders football seasons
Richmond Spiders football